Cvijan Šarić (1652–1668) was a Dalmatian Serb harambaša (senior hajduk commander) in the service of the Republic of Venice, part of the Morlach army that fought in the Cretan War (1645–69) alongside other notable fighters such as Janko Mitrović and Ilija Smiljanić. He was a Serbian Orthodox priest.

Biography
Šarić was an ethnic Serb, part of the Morlach community in Dalmatia. It is said that he was from the Šibenik frontier. He was a Serbian Orthodox priest. He held the rank of serdar. ]He is known by the title harambaša (bandit leader).

Around 1666, Šarić had a crucial influence on the Morlachs. In 1668, Šarić asked the Venetian provveditore of Venetian Dalmatia and Albania, on behalf of all the Orthodox Morlachs, to stop the local Catholics from harassing their bishop Kiril and throwing garbage near the Orthodox church. On 3 October 1668, the Venetian governor issued a statement and threatened a Mihovil Kapuan with a fine of 500 ducats for his involvement in the harassment of bishop Kiril. At this time there was great pressure on the Orthodox population of Venetian- and Habsburg-controlled territories to convert or become Uniate with the Catholic Church. Another request was turned in to the Dalmatian governor dated 1 November 1669, signed by a number of chiefs in Venetian service, including Šarić.

He is mentioned in Serbian epic poetry. There were several other Morlach chiefs surnamed Šarić, such as Milin Šarić, etc.

See also
Vuk Mandušić (fl. 1648), military commander in Austrian service
Bajo Pivljanin
Vuk Močivuna
Vid Žeravica
Todor Kladić
Morlachs
Morlachs (Venetian irregulars)
Stojan Janković (1636–1687), Morlach leader
Stanislav Sočivica, Venetian rebel
Sinobad
Petronije Selaković
Grujica Žeravica
Vukosav Puhalović
Ilija Smiljanić
Petar Smiljanić
Juraj Vranić
Tadije Vranić

Annotations
Name: He was also known as Cvitko (Цвитко Шарић), and his surname has also been scarcely rendered Šarinić (Шаринић) and Šorić (Шорић)

References

Sources

17th-century Serbian people
17th-century births
17th-century deaths
Republic of Venice military personnel
Serbian military leaders
Serbs of Croatia
Republic of Venice military personnel killed in action
Serbian Orthodox clergy